Argyropelecus affinis is a species of ray-finned fish in the family Sternoptychidae, found in the tropical and subtropical Atlantic, Indian and Pacific Oceans. Common names for this fish include Pacific hatchetfish, deepsea hatchetfish and slender hatchetfish. It inhabits the mesopelagic zone and is either non-migratory or performs short daily vertical migrations.

Description
It has a vertical mouth and tubular eyes that are directed upwards. There is a short spine in front of the operculum but no spine behind the eye. The dorsal fin has 9 short soft rays and there is also a dorsal adipose fin. The pectoral fin has 11 or 12 soft rays, the pelvic fin 6 and the anal fin 13. There are several short post-abdominal spines. The swim bladder is gas-filled and well-developed. This fish has a dark-coloured back and silvery sides, with darker pigment along the lateral line. The scales have a tendency to detach and adult fish have rows of photophores on the underside.

Distribution and habitat
This species is circum-global and is found in the warmer parts of the Atlantic, Indian and Pacific Oceans. It is plentiful off the coast of West Africa from about 10°S northwards, and is present as far south as 15°S near Madagascar. It is usually found in the mesopelagic zone. During the day, trawls at depths between  produce the highest catches and at night the greatest abundance of fish is in the depth range ; this indicates that some, but not necessarily all, fish make short daily vertical migrations.

Ecology
Adult Argyropelecus affinis feed on planktonic organisms, salps, krill, arrow worms, copepods and ostracods.

The lenses of the eyes of A. affinis contains yellow pigments that absorb short-wave radiation; the proportions of the two carotenoid-like pigments present change as the fish grows older. It is not clear what precise function is served by the pigments, but with some of the incident illumination being absorbed, the fish's absolute sensitivity to light must be reduced.

Status
Argyropelecus affinis is a common fish and is abundant in many parts of its wide range. No specific threats have been identified and the International Union for Conservation of Nature has rated its conservation status as being of "least concern".

References

Sternoptychidae
Fish described in 1899
Bioluminescent fish
Taxa named by Samuel Garman